Stephanos Mousouros (1841–1906) was an Ottoman Greek diplomatic official of the Ottoman Empire, who served as ambassador to Italy and the United Kingdom, and was the Ottoman-appointed Prince of Samos from 1896 to 1899.

Mousouros was the grandson of the first Prince of Samos, Stephanos Vogoridis, and the son of Konstantinos Mousouros, governor of Samos for Vogoridis. The family was Christian. His father had served as Ottoman ambassador to the United Kingdom for more than 30 years from 1850, and the young Stephanous thus lived in London in the early part of his life, and also served in minor positions at the embassy.

He was ambassador of the Ottoman Empire to the Kingdom of Italy, before he was appointed Prince of Samos in 1896. He ruled Samos well, putting the law above everything else. The political factionism on the island decreased. He built the roads connecting Vathi, Karlovasi, Marathokampos, Platanos, Pirgos and the capital.

He became ambassador of the Ottoman Empire to the United Kingdom in early 1903.

He was married to a Greek lady.

References

1841 births
1906 deaths
Princes of Samos
Ambassadors of the Ottoman Empire to Italy
Ambassadors of the Ottoman Empire to the United Kingdom
Stephanos
19th-century rulers in Europe